Christophe Laussucq (born May 20, 1973, in Bordeaux) is a French former rugby union footballer and current coach for Agen in the Top 14.

Christophe Laussucq's position of choice was scrum-half. He earned 4 caps for the France national team, making his debut on April 10, 1999, against Scotland. He retired from playing at the end of the 2007–08 season spent with the Leicester Tigers in the Guinness Premiership.

Honours
 Stade Français
French Rugby Union Championship/Top 14: 1997–98, 1999–2000

References

External links
Leicester Tigers profile

1973 births
Living people
French rugby union coaches
French rugby union players
France international rugby union players
Leicester Tigers players
Sportspeople from Bordeaux
CA Bordeaux-Bègles Gironde players
Stade Français players
Expatriate rugby union players in England
French expatriate sportspeople in England
French expatriate rugby union players
CS Bourgoin-Jallieu players
Rugby union scrum-halves
Section Paloise players
Castres Olympique players